This is the List of Sri Lankan monarchs by reign, detailing monarchs sorted by length of reign.

List

See also
 List of longest-reigning monarchs
 List of shortest-reigning monarchs
 Lists of state leaders
 Records of heads of state

Notes

References

External links
 Ancient Kings and Rulers of Sri Lanka (Ceylon)

Sinhalese
Monarchs, Sinhalese
R